Panchathi  is a village in the Aranthangirevenue block of Pudukkottai district, Tamil Nadu, India.

Demographics 

As per the 2001 census, Panchathi had a total population of 623 with 283 males and 340 females. Out of the total population 399 people were literate.

References

Villages in Pudukkottai district